The Roman Catholic Diocese of Wallis et Futuna (Latin: Dioecesis Uveanus et Futunensis; French: Diocèse de Wallis et Futuna) in Wallis and Futuna is  a suffragan diocese of the Roman Catholic Archdiocese of Nouméa. It was erected as a Vicariate Apostolic in 1935 and elevated to a diocese in 1966. The Bishop of Wallis et Futuna is a member of the Episcopal Conference of the Pacific.

Ordinaries
Alexandre Poncet, S.M. (1935–1961) 
Michel-Maurice-Augustin-Marie Darmancier, S.M. (1961–1974) 
Laurent Fuahea (1974–2005) - Bishop Emeritus
Ghislain Marie Raoul Suzanne de Rasilly, S.M. (2005–2018)
Susitino Sionepoe, S.M. (2019- )

External links and references

Resignation of Bishop de Rasilly S.M.

Wallis et Futuna
Roman Catholic dioceses in Wallis and Futuna
Catholic Church in Wallis and Futuna